The discography of Godspeed You! Black Emperor—a Canadian post-rock musical collective from Quebec—consists of seven studio albums, one extended play, one split single, and two contributions to various artists compilation albums.

Albums

Studio albums

Demos

Extended plays

Singles

Various artist compilations

Other songs
On 22 November 1998, the band recorded the song "Hung Over as the Queen in the Maida Vale" for a John Peel session; it was made up of the movements "Monheim", "Chart #3", and "Steve Reich". It was first transmitted on 19 January 1999. Later in 1999, the band recorded a radio session for VPRO which included "She Dreamt She Was a Bulldozer", "Steve Reich", "World Police and Friendly Fire", and "Moya".

Related projects
David Bryant, Bruce Cawdron, Aidan Girt, Mike Moya, Thea Pratt, Roger Tellier-Craig, and Sophie Trudeau
 Set Fire to Flames

Thierry Amar, Efrim Menuck, and Sophie Trudeau
 Thee Silver Mt. Zion Memorial Orchestra & Tra-La-La Band

Thierry Amar, Norsola Johnson, and Mike Moya
 Molasses

Thierry Amar and Efrim Menuck
 Vic Chesnutt (production and playing on North Star Deserter and At the Cut)
 Hannah Marcus (performers on Desert Farmers, tracks 2–5, 8, 9; Efrim – vocals on track 2)

Roger Tellier-Craig and Sophie Trudeau
 Et Sans

Mike Moya and Sophie Trudeau
 HṚṢṬA

Thierry Amar

 Black Ox Orkestar
 Land of Kush (bass guitar)
 Because of Ghosts (double bass, cello)

David Bryant
 Bliss
 Hiss Tracts

Bruce Cawdron
 Esmerine
 Triple Burner

Aidan Girt
 1-Speed Bike (aka Bottleskup Flenkenkenmike)
 Bottleskup Flenkenkenmike
 Exhaust
 Bakunin's Bum
 The Trapt
 Please Don't Put Charles on the Money

Norsola Johnson
 Sixtoo & Norsola (Collaboration)
 Amon Tobin's Foley Room (Performer)
 Land of Kush (cello)

Efrim Menuck
 Hangedup (recording and mixing)
 Lesbians on Ecstasy (recording and mixing on We Know You Know)
 Simon Finn (recording on Magic Moments)

Mike Moya
 Elizabeth Anka Vajagic's live band
 Lonesome Hanks

Mauro Pezzente
 Crowface
 Mauro Pezzente & Kiva Stimac (Infrequent performances at Hotel2Tango in 1995)

Roger Tellier-Craig
 Le Révélateur
 Fly Pan Am

 Shalabi Effect
 Klaxon Gueule

Sophie Trudeau
 Valley of the Giants
 Diebold
 Kiss Me Deadly
 The Mile End Ladies String Auxiliary Set

Various members
 Evangelista – Hello, Voyager (Efrim Menuck – recording, mixing, guitar, voice; Sophie Trudeau – violin, Thierry Amar – double bass)

References

Discographies of Canadian artists
 
Rock music group discographies
Alternative rock discographies